Leucippus may refer to:

Leucippus, a Greek philosopher
Leucippus (mythology), several figures in Greek mythology, including:
Leucippus (son of Thurimachus)
Leucippus (son of Perieres)
Leucippus (daughter of Galatea)
Leucippus (bird), a hummingbird genus
Leucippus (crater)
Leukippos asteroid